Rosebery Park was a football ground in the Oatlands area of Glasgow, Scotland. It was the home of Shawfield F.C. from 1918 to 1960, before being acquired by Glasgow Corporation as a venue for schools' football matches. The discovery that the site was contaminated led to the ground becoming derelict in the 1990s, and it was subsequently demolished.

History

Rosebery Park was named after the former Prime Minister, the 5th Earl of Rosebery. Located on the south-west side of Toryglen Street near Polmadie Road, it was the home of Shawfield from 1918 to 1960. Pollok also sometimes used the ground in the late 1920s whilst they were without a permanent ground. 

Following the demise of Shawfield, the Glasgow Corporation Education Committee arranged to buy the ground in 1961 in order to provide a venue for the schools' football competitions they organised. After being refurbished at a total cost of £14,000, the ground was reopened for schools' matches in April 1963. Proposals to stage speedway racing were put forward during the winter of 1986 - 1987 but nothing became of them. 

Rosebery Park fell into disuse after it was discovered that the site had become contaminated by Chrome waste from factories in nearby Shawfield, Rutherglen. It had not hosted football for a number of years prior to being cleared and redeveloped to make way for the M74 motorway extension.

References

External links
 Video-clip of derelict ground from 1998

Defunct football venues in Scotland
Shawfield F.C.
Gorbals
Demolished buildings and structures in Scotland
Football venues in Glasgow
Pollok F.C.